Yugoslav Committee was a political interest group formed by South Slavs from Austria-Hungary during World War I aimed at joining the existing south Slavic nations in an independent state.

Founding members included:
 Frano Supilo
 Ante Trumbić
 Ivan Meštrović
 Hinko Hinković
 Franko Potočnjak
 Nikola Stojanović
 Dušan Vasiljević

First three members were Croats from Kingdom of Dalmatia, next two members were Croats from Kingdom of Croatia -Slavonia, while the last two were Serbs from Bosnia and Herzegovina. Their initial gathering happened in 1914 while the committee was officially formed on 30 April 1915 in the Parisian Hotel Madisson. As Britain was the leader of the Entente, London was chosen as the headquarters of the Committee. The president was Ante Trumbić.

In 1915, there were 17 members in the Committee, of which 11 from the Croatian and Dalmatian littoral regions. During that year, the Committee formed branches in Paris, Geneva, St. Peterburg, Cleveland, Valparaiso and Washington. Their liaisons in the homeland were the United Yugoslav Youth, an illegal youth organisation formed in 1914 in Vienna (within Austria-Hungary), and the Government of the Kingdom of Serbia. Their relationship with the Serbian official politics was seen by the Committee members as necessary, but strained because of their occasionally conflicting political stances.

The Committee reacted negatively to Nikola Pašić's government open courting of Italy in 1916, which had said that Serbia recognized the Italian hegemony over the Adriatic and particularly the naval bases. Later the same year, they learnt of a memorandum by the Serbian government to the British where they explicitly staked a claim on various territories of Austria-Hungary where there were Serb Orthodox monasteries. However, they could not come to an agreement on that issue, and Frano Supilo left the Yugoslav Committee on 5 June 1916. He died the following year.

The committee signed the Corfu Declaration with the Kingdom of Serbia in 1917. It was a compromise declaration, advocating a parliamentary monarchy, with three nations and two alphabets equal before the law, religious freedom and universal suffrage. It received political sponsorship of Great Britain and France.

In October 1918, the State of Slovenes, Croats and Serbs was declared from the liberated lands from the Austro-Hungarian Empire in what would become the first incarnation of a Yugoslav state. This did not achieve recognition. In December, the State united with the Kingdom of Serbia (which had just expanded its borders after World War I to incorporate the Vojvodina region, and previously independent Montenegro) to form the Kingdom of Serbs, Croats and Slovenes. The Committee's task was accomplished.

Ante Trumbić later became an opponent of the June 1921 Vidovdan Constitution and the new Kingdom of Yugoslavia (January 1929). Ivan Meštrović refused to participate in state politics and committed himself to his art. He left the country permanently in 1942.

See also
 Polish National Committee (1917–1919)
 Czechoslovak National Council
 Romanian National Committee (1918)
 History of Yugoslavia
 Croatia in the first Yugoslavia
 Croatian Committee

References

Yugoslav unification
Kingdom of Yugoslavia
1910s in Yugoslavia
Yugoslavism
Organizations established in 1915
1910s in politics